Adrian Pătraș (born 28 September 1984) is a Moldovan football goalkeeper who plays for club FC Costuleni.

External links

Profile at FC Costuleni

1984 births
Living people
Moldovan footballers
Association football goalkeepers
FC Costuleni players
FC Milsami Orhei players